Sudhir Chakravarti (19 September 1934 – 15 December 2020) was a Bengali educationist and essayist. He made a vast contribution in Bengal's folk culture development and research. Chakravarti had completely changed the style of colonial prose with his new narrative style. He successfully had replaced the prevailing idea of essay-based writing being something of heavy scholarly matter with his graceful and humorous prose language.

Early life and career
Sudhir Chakravarti or Sudhir Prasad Chakravarti was born on 19 September 1934 at Shibpur. His father's name was Ramaprasad Chakravarti and his mother Beenapani Chakravarti. He was the youngest of the nine sons of Ramaprasad. Due to the fear of the Japanese bombardings in Kolkata, Chakravarti's father had shifted to Dignagar, Nadia, (where they had ancestral lands as Zamindars) from Shibpur, Howrah in his childhood. After that his family came to Krishnanagar, Nadia. Chakravarti completed his studies in Calcutta University. Chakravarti is known for his research works on Folk religion, Lalan Fakir and Cultural Anthropology in Bengal. He spent 30 years researching the folk culture by traveling to different villages all over the West Bengal. He was a professor of Bengali literature since 1958 to 1994, but even after retirement kept on teaching until 2011. Chakravarti worked in Krishnagar Government College, guest lecturer of Jadavpur University and was also associated with the Institute of Development Studies, Kolkata. He wrote and edited more than 85 books on various subjects like music, art, folk-religion, cultural anthropology. He was the editor of Bengali literary Magazine Dhrubapada. He died on 15 December 2020 in Kolkata.

Literary career 
From Rabindranath to Lalan Fakir, from Baul culture to clay modellers, modelling and painters and painting of rural Bengal, everything had become the subject of his interest and research. Besides research and writing, he has also being a prolific editor, his 'Dhruvapada' journal, which had 12 issues had created a sensation in the Bengali literary society.

His contribution to the study of Bengali folk culture is immense. His pen had authored immense detailed work on the sub-religions and cult of Kartabhaja, Balahari, Sahebdhani, their belief community and their songs, which were never paid much attention to by the intellectuals. It is to be noted that after William Hunter and Akshoy Kumar Dutta in the 18th century, few have paid attention to work on these sects. His book 'Bratya Lokayat Lalon' is considered as a milestone in the practice of Lalan Fakir.

He had collected songs of different communities in remote villages of Bengal by rigorous fieldwork, which makes him different from other researchers . He has recorded his research experience in folklore in the book 'Gabhir Nirjan Pathe'(Along deep lonely alleys) '. He won the Ananda Award in 2002 for his book 'Baul Fakir Kotha', and received Sahitya Akademi Award for the same in 2004.
 
He has also written books on Rabindra Sangeet and Music of Modern Bengal like 'Nirjan Ekaker Gaan: Rabindra Sangeet', 'Rabikarrekha', 'Elem Natun Deshe', 'Ganer Leela Sei Kinare', Preme Prana Gane '.Chakravarti in his time had stood to be one of the leading figure in Tagore study and Bengali Music. He was among the first man to embrace Suman Chattopadhyay 's new genre of Bengali Music. He had academically brought this new genre to the Bengali readers, this gave birth to Suman Chattopadhyay's book 'Sumaner Gaan Sumaner Bhasha. His famous column in 'Aajkal' on Music has discussed a varied range of music from the music of Rabindranath, Atulprasad, Iqbal to Shreya Ghosal, A. R Rahaman, all has been captured Chakravarti's range of work.

Works

1. Sahebdhani Sampraday O tader gaan (সাহেবধনী সম্প্রদায় তাদের গান), 1985

2. Ganer Lilar Sei Kinare (গানের লীলার সেই কিনারে), 1985

3. Krishnagarer Mritshilpo o Mritshilpi Samaj (কৃষ্ণনগরের মৃৎশিল্প ও মৃৎশিল্পী সমাজ), 1985

4. Balahari Sampraday o Tader Gaan (বলাহাড়ি সম্প্রদায় আর তাদের গান), 1986

5. Gabhir Nirjan Pathe (গভীর নির্জন পথে),1989

6. Dwijendralal Smaran Bismaran (দ্বিজেন্দ্রলাল রায় স্মরণ বিস্মরণ), 1989

7. Bangla Ganer Sandhane (বাংলা গানের সন্ধানে), 1990

8. Sadar -Mafaswal (সদর-মফস্বল), 1990

9. Agradwiper Gopinath (অগ্রদ্বীপের গোপীনাথ), 1992

10. Nirjan Ekaker Gaan Rabindrasangeet (নির্জন এককের গান রবীন্দ্র সংগীত),1992

11. Bangla Ganer char diganta (বাংলা গানের চার দিগন্ত), 1992

12. Bratya Lokayata Lalan (ব্রাত্য লোকায়ত লালন),1992

13. Chalchitrer Chitralekha (চালচিত্রের চিত্রলেখা), 1993

14. Bangla Filmer Gaan O Satyajit Ray (বাংলা ফিল্মের গান ও সত্যজিৎ রায়),1994

15. Nirbas (নির্বাস), 1995

16. Panchagramer Karacha (পঞ্চগ্রামের কড়চা), 1995

17. Paschimbanger Mela o Mohotsav (পশ্চিমবঙ্গের মেলা ও মহোৎসব), 1996

18.Debabrata Biswaser Gaan(দেবব্রত বিশ্বাসের গান), 1997

19. Lalan (লালন), 1998

20. Mati-Prithibir Tane (মাটি-পৃথিবীর টানে), 1999

21. Baul Fakir Katha (বাউল ফকির কথা),2001

22. Bangla Ganer Alokporbo (বাংলা গানের আলোকপর্ব),2001

23. Gane Gane Gaoya (গানে গানে গাওয়া),2003

24. Banglar Gounadharma : Sahebdhani O Bolahari (বাংলার গৌণধর্ম সাহেবধনী ও বলাহাড়ি), 2003

25. Rupe Barne Chande (রূপে বর্ণে ছন্দে),2003

26. Lekha Pora Kore Je (লেখা পড়া করে যে), 2003

27.Utsabe, Melay Itihase (উৎসবে মেলায় ইতিহাসে), 2004

28. Ghanaran Bahirana (ঘরানা বাহিরানা),2006

29. Kabitar Vichitra Pathe (কবিতার বিচিত্রপথে), 2006

30. Gaan Hote Gaane (গান হতে গানে),2008

31. Lokayoter Antarmohol (লোকায়তের অন্তরমহল), 2008

32. Shamuk Jhinuk (শামুক ঝিনুক), 2009

33. Akhyaner Khoje (আখ্যানের খোঁজে),2009

34. Loksomaj O Lokchitra (লোকসমাজ ও লোকচিত্র), 2009

35. Rabindranath Anekanta (রবীন্দ্রনাথ অনেকান্ত), 2010

36.Nirjansajane (নির্জনসজনে), 2011

37. Alaldost Sevakamalini lalan (আলালদোস্ত সেবাকমলিনী লালন),2011

38.Manini Rupmati Kubir Gosai (মানিনী রূপমতী কুবির গোঁসাই), 2012

39. Kabitar Khonje (কবিতার খোঁজে),2012

40. Dekha na Dekhaye Mesha (দেখা না দেখায় মেশা),2012

41. Sudhir Chakravarti Rachanavali -1 (সুধীর চক্রবর্তী রচনাবলি-প্রথম খণ্ড),2012

42. Sudhir Chakravarti Rachanavali -2 (সুধীর চক্রবর্তী রচনাবলি- দ্বিতীয় খণ্ড),2013

43. Chorano Ei Jibon (ছড়ানো এই জীবন),2013

44. Bhadrajaner Drishtite Lalan Fakir (ভদ্রজনের দৃষ্টিতে লালন ফকির), 2013

45. Sahityer Lokayata Path (সাহিত্যের লোকায়ত পাঠ), 2013

46. Anek Diner Anek Katha (অনেক দিনের অনেক কথা), 2013

47. Abataler Rupabali Abataler Padabali (অবতলের রূপাবলি, অবতলের পদাবলি), 2013

Awards
Chakravarti received the Ananda Purashkar in 2002 for his book Baul Fakir Katha and the Sahitya Akademi Award 2004. He got the awards of Eminent Teacher from Calcutta University in 2006, Narasimha Das award Medal from Delhi University and the Dr. Sukumar Sen Gold Medal from the Asiatic Society. He has also been awarded by the Tagore research Institute the title of Rabindratatvacharya.

References

1934 births
2020 deaths
Indian folklorists
Bengali writers
Bengali Hindus
20th-century Bengalis
21st-century Bengalis
Bengali historians
Recipients of the Sahitya Akademi Award in Bengali
University of Calcutta alumni
Academic staff of the University of Calcutta
People from Nadia district
Recipients of the Ananda Purashkar
Writers from Kolkata
Indian writers
Indian male writers
20th-century Indian writers
20th-century Indian male writers
21st-century Indian writers
21st-century Indian male writers
Indian lecturers
Indian musicologists
Indian scholars
20th-century Indian scholars
21st-century Indian scholars
Indian essayists
Indian male essayists
20th-century Indian essayists
21st-century Indian essayists
Educationists from India
Indian non-fiction writers
Indian male non-fiction writers
20th-century Indian non-fiction writers
21st-century Indian non-fiction writers
Indian educators
20th-century Indian educators
21st-century Indian educators
Educators from West Bengal